is the fourth season of the animated television series Bakugan: Battle Planet. It was formally announced on October 13, 2021.

The season premiered in Canada on Teletoon on February 6, 2022.
On March 4, 2022, the Japanese version debuted bi-weekly on April 1, 2022. Netflix streamed the first half of Bakugan: Evolutions on April 1, 2022.  Netflix released the second half on September 1, 2022. 



Episode list

Notes

References

Bakugan episode lists
2022 Canadian television seasons
2022 Japanese television seasons
2023 Japanese television seasons